Agios Georgios is a village in the Lassithi Plateau in the island of Crete, and also a municipal unit. In 1981 its population was 1,030, but has steadily fallen since to 717 in 1991; 541 in 2001, and 490 in 2011.

Locations near Agios Georgios include the small village of Koudoumalia and the village of Avrakode and also Limnakaro Plateau (height ).

It is the second largest village in Lassithi Plateau, home of a Folklore Museum, the only elementary school in Lassithi Plateau and also the only kindergarten in the Municipality.

It also has a small historical museum pharmacy, hotels and small restaurants.

It is a starting point for an ascent of the Dikti (height ), and the E4 trail goes through the village.
Many people with ancestry from the village of Agios Georgios live now in Heraklion and in Hersonissos. In wintertime, when the Lasithi Plateau is snow-covered, many of the villagers in Agios Georgios would have descended to occupy the settlement of Analipsi on the northern coast of Crete, 5 km west of Hersonisssos and part of the Hersonissos Municipality where they cultivated olives.

References

Villages in Greece
Populated places in Lasithi